The 1820–21 United States Senate elections were held on various dates in various states, corresponding with James Monroe's landslide re-election. As these U.S. Senate elections were prior to the ratification of the Seventeenth Amendment in 1913, senators were chosen by state legislatures. Senators were elected over a wide range of time throughout 1820 and 1821, and a seat may have been filled months late or remained vacant due to legislative deadlock. In these elections, terms were up for the senators in Class 1.

The Democratic-Republican Party gain one-to-five seats (in the general and special elections), assuming almost complete control of the Senate.

Results summary 
Senate party division, 17th Congress (1821–1823)

 Majority party: Democratic-Republican (39–43)
 Minority party: Federalist (4)
 Vacant: (3–1)
 Total seats: 46–48

Change in composition

Before the elections 

Composition after the June 13 and 14, 1820 elections in Maine.

Result of the general elections

Result of the special elections in the next Congress

Race summaries 
Bold states link to specific election articles.

Special elections during the preceding Congress 
In these special elections, the winner was elected during 1820 or before March 4, 1821; ordered by election date.

Races leading to the next Congress 
In these general elections, the winner was seated on March 4, 1821; ordered by state.

All of the elections involved the Class 1 seats.

Special elections during the next Congress 
In this special election, the winner was elected in 1821 after March 4; ordered by election date.

Connecticut

Delaware

Georgia (special)

Indiana

Kentucky (special)

Maine 

John Holmes (Democratic-Republican) was elected as one of the new states first pair of senators whose terms began with June 13, 1820, statehood.  He was elected to the class 1 seat's short term, which ended March 3, 1821, and was re-elected January 31, 1821, to the term starting March 4, 1821.

John Chandler (Democratic-Republican) as elected to the class 2 seat's long term, and his term would end March 3, 1823.

Maryland 

William Pinkney won election by an unknown amount of votes, for the Class 1 seat.

Massachusetts

Massachusetts (regular)

Massachusetts (special)

Mississippi

Mississippi (regular)

Mississippi (special)

Missouri

New Jersey

New York

New York (regular)

New York (special)

Ohio

Pennsylvania

Rhode Island

Rhode Island (regular)

Rhode Island (special)

Tennessee

Tennessee (regular)

Tennessee (special)

Vermont

Virginia

See also 
 1820 United States elections
 1820 United States presidential election
 1820–21 United States House of Representatives elections
 16th United States Congress
 17th United States Congress
 Elections in the United States

Notes

References 

 Party Division in the Senate, 1789-Present, via Senate.gov